Alejandro García Tous (born 13 September 1976 in Alicante, Valencia, Spain) is a Spanish actor. He best known for playing Álvaro Aguilar on the popular Spanish television comedy-drama Yo soy Bea.

Biography
Tous was born to parents who owned a catering service. He has a twin brother, Angel, and an older sister, Beatriz. His brother became famous for being a contestant on Big Brother.

He wanted to be a veterinarian and a firefighter before deciding to become an actor. He studied acting at a theater school in his hometown.

Career

Film
 Miss Tacuarembó (2010)
 Inertes (2008)
 Spinnin': 6000 millones de personas diferentes (2007) .... Gárate
 Los fantasmas de Goya  (2006)
 Habitación en alquiler (2006) .... Vidal
 Ropa ajustada (2006)
 Hable con ella (2002)
 Tiempos de Azúcar (2001)
 Son de mar (2001)
 V.O. (2001)
 Sofia (2002)

Television
  (2009)
 Yo soy Bea (2006–2008)... Álvaro Aguilar
 Mis adorables vecinos (2006, three episodes)... Inspector
 Odiosas (2006)
 
 
 Siete Vidas (Episode: , 2005)
 Los Serrano (Episode: , 2005)... Alfonso Enríquez
 Un paso adelante (Episode: , 2005)... Alberto
 Lobos (Episode: , 2005)... Dani
 Hospital Central (Episode: , 2004)... Fede

Music videos 

 No voy a cambiar by Malú, from album Desafío (2007)
 Mil noches y una más by Gisela, from album Parte de mí (2002)

External links

References 

1976 births
Living people
Spanish male film actors
Spanish male television actors
People from Alicante
21st-century Spanish male actors
Male actors from the Valencian Community